"Wrapped Up in a Dream" is a song written by Pat Best and Irving Berman. It was performed by a group called Do, Ray & Me (sometimes called the Do-Ray-Me Trio). Its members were Joel Cowen (tenor, guitar), Al Russell (tenor, piano), and Curtis Wilder (tenor, bass fiddle). The record was released on the Commodore label (catalog no. C-7505-A) and peaked at No. 2 on Billboard magazine's R&B chart in March 1949. It was ranked No. 13 on Billboards year-end list of the best-selling R&B records of 1949 (No. 15 based on juke box plays).

See also
 Billboard Top R&B Records of 1949

References

1949 songs
Rhythm and blues songs